In the Blink of an Eye may refer to:

Music 
 "In the Blink of an Eye", a 2003 song by A-Teens
 "In the Blink of an Eye" (song), a 2004 song by MercyMe
 In the Blink of an Eye (album), a 2009 album by FACT

Films 
 In the Blink of an Eye (1996 film), a 1996 film directed by Micki Dickoff
 In the Blink of an Eye (film), a 2009 film directed by Michael Sinclair

Books 
 In The Blink of an Eye: How Vision Sparked the Big Bang of Evolution, a 2004 book by Andrew Parker
 In the Blink of an Eye (Murch book), a 2005 book by Walter Murch

See also 
 Blink of an Eye (disambiguation)
 In ictu oculi, a Latin expression meaning in the blink of an eye